Strolling of the Heifers is an annual local food parade and festival hosted in Brattleboro, Vermont each year. The organization behind the parade has expanded to support other local food initiatives, most notably a Locavore Index, which evaluates the availability and policy support for local food in American states.

Festival 
The celebration was founded in 2002 by Orly Munzing, with a focus on sustainable agriculture in the region. The parade was inspired by the Running of the Bulls, but instead of enraged bulls, groomed heifers are walked down the main street. 

Senator Bernie Sanders attends the parade nearly every year, and has been credited with inspiring the parade by founder Orly Munzing.

Other programs 
Strolling of the Heifers has expanded from just running a parade, to also include small business development programs and local food advocacy programs. For example, they ran a culinary skills program for training the local workforce. The organization also publishes its annual Locavore Index, which rates the capacity of different states for providing local food. 

The Strolling of the Heifers owns The River Garden, a building in downtown Brattleboro.

References 

2002 establishments in Vermont
Brattleboro, Vermont
Sustainable agriculture
Bernie Sanders
Festivals in Vermont